Atamkul (Atamkül) is a rural locality (a selo) in Tarkazinsky Selsoviet, Yermekeyevsky District, Bashkortostan, Russia. The population was 104 as of 2010. There is 1 street.

Geography 
Atamkul is located 42 km south of Yermekeyevo (the district's administrative centre) by road. Arkayevka is the nearest rural locality.

References 

Rural localities in Yermekeyevsky District